Robert Oran Evans  (born September 7, 1946) is an American college basketball coach. He was most recently the associate head coach with the University of North Texas. Evans served as head men's basketball coach at the University of Mississippi (Ole  Miss) from 1992 to 1998 and Arizona State University from 1998 to 2006.

Early years
Evans was born in Hobbs, New Mexico, the son of Gladys (née Spirlin), a home cleaner, and Oscar, a preacher and janitor. Robert was the fourth of seven children, all of whom would go on to graduate college.

Evans played high school basketball at Hobbs High School under legendary coach Ralph Tasker. His senior year he was named co-captain. That year the team made it to the 1964 championship game and Evans was invited to the state all-star game in Albuquerque.

Evans played junior college basketball at what is now Lubbock Christian University where he was named the school's first All-American. Both seasons he played at Lubbock Christian Evans was voted the teams’ best defensive player. In his second year with the team Evans was named team captain. In 1966 Evans earned his associate degree in Arts and Sciences. At Lubbock Christian Evans was teammates with Gerald Turner who would later become Chancellor of the University of Mississippi. Turner was instrumental in Evans’ hiring as head basketball coach in 1992.

Evans transferred to New Mexico State University for the 1966–67 season where he was coached by Lou Henson. He was named team captain and led the Aggies to a 15–11 record and an NCAA tournament appearance. The next season Evans again captained the team to a 23–6 record and another NCAA tournament appearance. In 1967 Evans was selected NMSU's most outstanding athlete. In May 1968 Evans earned his bachelor's degree in education.

Coaching career
After his graduation, Evans was hired as an assistant at New Mexico State under Henson.  When Henson left for Illinois in 1976, Evans moved to Texas Tech and served for 14 years as an assistant under Gerald Myers.  After two years as an assistant at Oklahoma State under Eddie Sutton, Evans was hired at Ole Miss as its first black coach in a major sport.

Evans inherited a program that had been one of the dregs of the Southeastern Conference for decades.  The Rebels had not had a winning season in SEC play since 1982–83, and had only finished in the top half of the conference twice in 59 years of conference play.  After four years rebuilding the program, the Rebels shocked the SEC by winning consecutive West Division titles in 1997 and 1998 and notching the first 20-win seasons in school history.  Ole Miss had been one of the few longstanding members of a "power conference" to have never won 20 games in a season.

In 1998, Evans moved to Arizona State, which was reeling in the wake of a point-shaving scandal.  His tenure at Arizona State was not nearly as successful as his tenure at Ole Miss, with only one NCAA appearance in eight seasons  He was fired after the 2006 season.

Professional players coached
Ole Miss
 Ansu Sesay

Arizona State
 Ike Diogu
 Eddie House
 Tommy Smith
 Awvee Storey

Head coaching record

References

1944 births
Living people
American men's basketball players
Arizona State Sun Devils men's basketball coaches
Basketball coaches from New Mexico
Basketball players from New Mexico
College men's basketball head coaches in the United States
Junior college men's basketball players in the United States
New Mexico State Aggies men's basketball coaches
New Mexico State Aggies men's basketball players
Oklahoma State Cowboys basketball coaches
Ole Miss Rebels men's basketball coaches
People from Hobbs, New Mexico
TCU Horned Frogs men's basketball coaches
Texas Tech Red Raiders basketball coaches